Kawachi Bosai Dam is an earthen dam located in Saga Prefecture in Japan. The dam is used for agriculture. The catchment area of the dam is 4.5 km2. The dam impounds about 12  ha of land when full and can store 1195 thousand cubic meters of water.

References

Dams in Saga Prefecture
1971 establishments in Japan